Arenz, Röder and Dagmar v. Germany (Communication No. 1138/2002) was a case decided by the UN Human Rights Committee in 2004.

Facts

In 1991, the Christian Democratic Union declared affiliation with Scientology incompatible with CDU membership. In 1992 and 1994, the applicants were expelled from CDU. Party decisions were upheld by German courts (Para. 2.-3. of the views).

The applicants alleged violations of their rights under articles 2, paragraph 1 (non-discrimination), 18 (freedom of religion), 19 (freedom of expression), 22 (freedom of association), 25 (political participation), 26 (non-discrimination) and 27 (minority rights) of the Covenant (Para. 4.).

HRC views

The committee has rejected Germany's objections that the case was inadmissible due to decisions being taken by a party, not by state (Para. 8.5.).

However, it decided that "8.6. (..) The issue before the Committee is whether the State party violated the authors' rights under the Covenant in that its courts gave priority to the principle of party autonomy, over their wish to be members in a political party that did not accept them due to their membership in another organization of ideological nature. The Committee recalls its constant jurisprudence that it is not a fourth instance competent to reevaluate findings of fact or reevaluate the application of domestic legislation, unless it can be ascertained that the proceedings before the domestic courts were arbitrary or amounted to a denial of justice. (..) the authors have failed to substantiate, for purposes of admissibility, that the conduct of the courts of the State party would have amounted to arbitrariness or a denial of justice. Therefore, the communication is inadmissible"

External links
HRC views

Christian Democratic Union of Germany
Freedom of association
Human rights in Germany
United Nations Human Rights Committee case law
2004 in case law
2004 in Germany
Scientology litigation